is a retired Japanese badminton player who was affiliated with Unisys badminton team. She is an Olympic Games gold medalist, two-time Asian Champion, two-time Asian Games silver medalist, and World Championship bronze medalist.

Playing for the Unisys team with her regular partner Misaki Matsutomo in the women's doubles, she won five National Championships titles. In the international event, Takahashi and Matsutomo were ranked world number ones in October 2014. They won numerous international titles, including the year-end tournament finals in 2014 and 2018; the historical All England Open in 2016; the Olympic Games in 2016; and also the Asian Championships in 2016 and 2017. The duo won the Badminton World Federation's Female Player of the Year award in 2016.

Takahashi was also a member of the victorious Japanese team at the 2017 Asia Mixed Team Championships and of the victorious women's team at the 2018 Asia Team Championships, 2018 Asian Games, and the 2018 Uber Cup.

Career 
In 2016, Takahashi and Misaki Matsutomo won the women's doubles gold medal at the Summer Olympics in Rio de Janeiro, Brazil, became the first ever Japan's to win an Olympic badminton gold medal. She and her women's doubles partner Matsutomo also honored with the Female Player of the Year award. They are playing together for more than ten years, ever since they were schoolmates. Takahashi and Matsutomo became the first pair from outside China to win the women's Olympic doubles title since the 1996 Atlanta Games, giving Japan its second medal in the event after Mizuki Fujii and Reika Kakiiwa took silver at the 2012 London Olympic Games.

Takahashi announced her retirement in an online conference on 19 August 2020, and officially left the national and Unisys team at the end of August.

Personal life 
Takahashi is the older sister of Sayaka Takahashi, a singles badminton player. In 2020, Ayaka announced that she had married Yuki Kaneko, a teammate in both the Japanese national and Unisys teams. Kaneko is also Matsutomo's mixed doubles partner.

Achievements

Olympic Games 
Women's doubles

BWF World Championships 
Women's doubles

Asian Games 
Women's doubles

Asian Championships 
Women's doubles

BWF World Tour (6 titles, 6 runners-up) 
The BWF World Tour, which was announced on 19 March 2017 and implemented in 2018, is a series of elite badminton tournaments sanctioned by the Badminton World Federation (BWF). The BWF World Tour is divided into levels of World Tour Finals, Super 1000, Super 750, Super 500, Super 300 (part of the HSBC World Tour), and the BWF Tour Super 100.

Women's doubles

BWF Superseries (9 titles, 13 runners-up) 
The BWF Superseries, which was launched on 14 December 2006 and implemented in 2007, was a series of elite badminton tournaments, sanctioned by the Badminton World Federation (BWF). BWF Superseries levels were Superseries and Superseries Premier. A season of Superseries consisted of twelve tournaments around the world that had been introduced since 2011. Successful players were invited to the Superseries Finals, which were held at the end of each year.

Women's doubles

 BWF Superseries Finals tournament
 BWF Superseries Premier tournament
 BWF Superseries tournament

BWF Grand Prix (7 titles, 1 runner-up) 
The BWF Grand Prix had two levels, the Grand Prix and Grand Prix Gold. It was a series of badminton tournaments sanctioned by the Badminton World Federation (BWF) and played between 2007 and 2017.

Women's doubles

Mixed doubles

 BWF Grand Prix Gold tournament
 BWF Grand Prix tournament

BWF International Challenge/Series (5 titles, 2 runners-up) 
Women's singles

Women's doubles

 BWF International Challenge tournament
 BWF International Series tournament

Performance timeline

National team 
 Senior level

Individual competitions 
 Senior level

Record against selected opponents 
Record against year-end Finals finalists, World Championships semi-finalists, and Olympic quarter-finalists.

Misaki Matsutomo

References

External links 

1990 births
Living people
People from Kashihara, Nara
Sportspeople from Nara Prefecture
Japanese female badminton players
Badminton players at the 2016 Summer Olympics
Olympic badminton players of Japan
Olympic gold medalists for Japan
Olympic medalists in badminton
Medalists at the 2016 Summer Olympics
Badminton players at the 2014 Asian Games
Badminton players at the 2018 Asian Games
Asian Games gold medalists for Japan
Asian Games silver medalists for Japan
Asian Games bronze medalists for Japan
Asian Games medalists in badminton
Medalists at the 2014 Asian Games
Medalists at the 2018 Asian Games
World No. 1 badminton players
BWF Best Female Player of the Year